is a Japanese shōjo manga written and illustrated by Mika Yamamori. It ran in Margaret from 2011 to 2014. A live-action film adaptation of the same name was released in 2017, as well as a collaboration clothing line with Earth Music & Ecology in 2014.

Plot
Suzume Yosano's parents move to Bangladesh when her father's position gets relocated, while Suzume herself moves to Tokyo to live with her uncle, Yukichi. On the way to her uncle's house, Suzume gets lost and is helped by a stranger. She later learns on her first day of school that the stranger is her homeroom teacher, Satsuki Shishio.

Characters

Played by: Mei Nagano
Suzume moves from the countryside to Tokyo to live with her uncle while she goes to high school. When she was in middle school, she saw a shooting star during the daytime and is convinced that she can see one again. She skips classes and hangs out on the rooftop frequently at school, often leaving poor grades. When she arrives to her new school, she is assigned to sit next to Mamura in class. She meets Shishio, who she discovers to be her homeroom teacher, when she is en route to her uncle's house. She eventually falls in love with him. Since he knows her uncle, the two see each other fairly often. She confesses her feelings, but is rejected. Unable to get over him, she confesses once more. This time Shishio accepts and they date in secret. This only lasts a short time, since Shishio thinks their love for one another was not really love. Feeling upset and rejected, Suzume becomes depressed, to the point where she runs away back to the countryside. Mamura tries to make her feel better by taking her to an aquarium she went to with Shishio. At first she rejects going, but begins to realize why Mamura is taking her. She begins to see how much Mamura cares for her, and realizes she is in love with him. She runs to his house and confesses to him, which he accepts. They begin to date afterwards.

Played by: Shohei Miura
Suzume's homeroom teacher. He somewhat reluctantly falls in love with Suzume. After she confesses to him for a second time, he agrees to date her in secret. Eventually Shishio asks Suzume what she would do if he stopped teaching. Suzume replies with “I’m going with you,” to his surprise, so he says he was just kidding. Shishio and Suzume's relationship is inadvertently discovered by Suzume's uncle Yukichi to which he disapproved. Shishio realises the gravity of his situation then says they should just quit “it”—their relationship—and just go back to having a normal student-teacher relationship. He says that her love for him was just “admiration,” and she does not really love him at all. However, he realizes he still loves her, but cannot be with her. This angers Mamura that Shishio hurt Suzume, leaving their relationship often constricted.  By the time he tries to get back together with her, she is already dating Mamura.

Played by: Alan Shirahama
Suzume's classmate who sits in front of her. He is a gynophobe. Upon discovering this, Suzume uses it to blackmail him into being her friend. Once he becomes friends with her, he begins to get more used to being around girls and starts to develop feelings for Suzume. He is fairly jealous of Shishio and Suzume's relationship (romantic or not) and becomes protective and supportive in the times Suzume is hurt emotionally. Despite his feelings, Mamura decides to keep them hidden only revealing them when he discovers Shishio's decision to cease his relationship with Suzume. When they move up to second year of high school, Mamura becomes popular with the underclassmen much to the chagrin of Suzume. Suzume's friends come up with the idea to have Mamura and Suzume pretend to date in order to make the underclass girls leave him alone. When he takes her to an aquarium he confesses his feelings for her, to which she is unsure how to react. Upon going home, Suzume realizes she is in love with him and accepts his confession and the two begin to date.
Mamura's appearance was based on model Kentaro Sakaguchi.

Played by: Maika Yamamoto
Yuyuka is very blunt, which she believes makes it hard to get along with others. She hides behind a cute exterior that is friendly and outgoing in order to make friends. Initially, Yuyuka was only pretending to be nice in order to get closer to Mamura, but the two later become honest friends. She eventually confesses to Mamura, who rejects her, saying that he has feelings for Suzume. She is comforted by Togyuu Minagawa, whom she slowly develops feelings for. As friends with Suzume, she often gives relationship advice.

Played by: Shieri Ohata
A classmate and friend of Suzume's.

Played by: Rina Koyama
A classmate and friend of Suzume's. She is of mixed ethnicities (but is part Japanese). She later dates Manabu Inukai.

A classmate of Suzume's who is also the class president. He later dates Tsurutani.

An upperclassmen of Suzume. He is a bit of a playboy and is interested in Yuyuka.

Played by: Ryuta Sato
Suzume's uncle. He is unmarried and owns a cafe. He is friends with Shishio.

Media

Manga

Daytime Shooting Star is written and illustrated by Mika Yamamori. The series first was announced on May 3, 2011. The manga was serialized in the bi-weekly magazine Margaret from May 20, 2011 to November 2014. The chapters were later released in bound volumes by Shueisha under the Margaret Comics imprint.

In honor of the 50th anniversary of Margaret, Yamamori collaborated with Momoko Koda, the author of No Longer Heroine, to release the crossover comic Heroine Shooting Star. Heroine Shooting Star was released in Mini Margaret, a booklet that was distributed as a magazine gift in the May 20, 2013 issue of Margaret. In 2014, Yamamori collaborated with Suu Morishita, the author of Like a Butterfly, to produce two crossover comics, Hibi Shooting Star and Daytime Chōchō.

To promote the live-action movie, Yamamori released Daytime Shooting Star: Side Story Blue in the February 3, 2017 issue of Margaret. It was followed up by Daytime Shooting Star: Side Story Red in the March 28, 2017 issue of Margaret.

In 2018, Viz Media announced at the New York Comic-Con that they were licensing the series for English distribution, with all comics published under the Shojo Beat imprint.

Live-action film

In mid-September 2016, the live-action film adaptation was announced. The film stars Mei Nagano as Suzume, Shohei Miura as Shishio, and Alan Shirahama as Mamura. The film was released in Japan on March 24, 2017 in 272 theaters and opened at #5 on opening weekend. The film's theme song is "Hayaku Aitai" by Dream Ami.

Yamamori released Daytime Shooting Star: Side Story Blue in the February 3, 2017 issue of Margaret and Daytime Shooting Star: Side Story Red in the March 28, 2017 issue of Margaret to promote the film. Nagano and Shirahama were also featured in a collaboration commercial as their characters to cross-promote handbags from Samantha Vega, a sister brand of Samantha Thavasa.

Reception
The series has 1.93 million copies in print and 500,000 in paid digital copies.

See also
In the Clear Moonlit Dusk — Another manga series by the same author

References

External links
  at Viz Media
 

2010s Japanese films
2011 manga
2014 comics endings
Films directed by Takehiko Shinjō
Live-action films based on manga
Manga adapted into films
Romance anime and manga
Shōjo manga
Shueisha franchises
Shueisha manga
Toho films
Viz Media manga